Beit Furik is a Palestinian town located nine kilometers southeast of Nablus, in the Nablus Governorate of the State of Palestine, in the northern West Bank. According to the Palestinian Central Bureau of Statistics, the town had a population of 10,339 inhabitants in 2007.

Location
Beit Furik is  located 8.24 km south east of Nablus. It is bordered by Al Jiftlik to the east, Ar Rajman, Yanun, and 'Awarta to the south, Rujeib and Nablus  to the west, and Beit Dajan, Salim and Deir al Hatab to the north.

History
Old tombs have been found here.

Neubauer, and others, suggested that it was the place called Ferka in the Talmud, but Abel suggested locating that at Farkha.  It has also been suggested that this place is mention in the Samaritan Chronicle.

In the Crusader era, it was known as  Bethflori, and in 1241 CE there was fought a battle here, according to Ibn el-Jawzi.

Ottoman era
The population was 68 households, all Muslim. They paid a  fixed  tax rate of 33,3% on agricultural products, such as  wheat, barley, summer crops, olive trees, goats and beehives, a press for olive oil or grape syrup, in addition to occasional revenues and a fixed tax for people of Nablus area; a total of 16,665 akçe.

In 1838, Edward Robinson noted it on his travels in the area, and as part of the El-Beitawy district, east of Nablus.

In 1870, Victor Guérin noted Beit Foureik sitting on the slopes of a hill, with  a belt of olives surrounding it.

In 1882, the Palestine Exploration Fund's Survey of Western Palestine described it as: "A small village in a nook of the hills near the plain of Salim. It has a well to the east."

During the 19th century and mid-20th century, Beit Furik was the main supplier of lime to the Nabulsi soap industry based in Nablus.

British Mandate era
In the 1922 census of Palestine conducted by the British Mandate authorities, Bait Furik had a population of 744 Muslims  increasing in the 1931 census, where Beit Furik (together with the smaller location Kh. Beita) had  a population of 867 Muslims, in a total of 262 houses.

In  the 1945 statistics  Beit Furik  (including Kh. Kafr Beita) had a population of 1,240, all Muslims,  with 36,663  dunams of land, according to an official land and population survey. Of this, 2,645 dunams were plantations and irrigable land, 12,453 used for cereals, while 53 dunams were built-up land.

Jordanian era
In the wake of the 1948 Arab–Israeli War, and after the 1949 Armistice Agreements, Beit Furik came under Jordanian rule.

In 1961, the population of Beit Furik was  1,997 persons.

1967, aftermath
Since the Six-Day War in 1967, Beit Furik has been under Israeli occupation along with the rest of the Palestinian territories. The population in the 1967 census conducted by  Israel was 2,416, of whom 7  originated from the Israeli territory.

Under the interim Oslo Peace Accords, areas of the West Bank were divided into various categories. According to  ARIJ,  45% of the village land is in Area B, while the remaining 55% is in Area C.

Israel has confiscated 441 dunums from  Beit Furik for the two Israeli settlements of Itamar and  Michola.  In addition it has confiscated land for Israeli military bases, Israeli settlement roads, and Israeli fence.

References

Bibliography

 
 
 
 
 
  
  
 

 
 

 
 
 
  
  
 (p.  205)
     ( p. 30, no. 121)

External links
Welcome to Bayt Furik
Beit Furik Welcome to Palestine
Survey of Western Palestine, Map 12: IAA,  Wikimedia commons 
Beit Furik town profile,  Applied Research Institute–Jerusalem (ARIJ)
Beit Furik, aerial photo, ARIJ
Development Priorities and Needs in Beit Furik, ARIJ
IDF admits barring Palestinians' access to own fields Admission was made in the state's response to a High Court petition filed last year by Beit Furik residents. By Chaim Levinson,  Apr.11, 2012, Haaretz
Settler attacks raise West Bank tension ahead of U.N.  Reuters,  Sep 15, 2011

Nablus Governorate
Towns in the West Bank
Municipalities of West Bank